Levi D. Carpenter (August 21, 1802 – October 27, 1856) was an American lawyer and politician who served briefly as a United States representative from New York from 1844 to 1845.

Biography 
Carpenter was born in Waterville, New York on August 21, 1802, where he attended the public schools and studied law. He was admitted to the bar and commenced practice in Waterville, New York. He was supervisor of the town of Sangerfield, New York in 1835.

Congress 
Carpenter was elected as a Democrat to the 28th United States Congress to fill the vacancy caused by the resignation of Samuel Beardsley and served from November 5, 1844, to March 3, 1845. He was not a candidate for reelection in 1844 to the 29th United States Congress.

Later career and death 
He resumed the practice of law in Waterville, New York and died there on October 27, 1856, and is interred in the City Cemetery.

External links

1802 births
1856 deaths
Democratic Party members of the United States House of Representatives from New York (state)
People from Waterville, New York
19th-century American politicians